National Democracy may refer to:
 National Democracy (Czech Republic)
 National Democracy (Italy)
 National Democracy (Philippines)
 National Democracy (Poland)
 National Democracy (Spain)

See also 
 Civic nationalism, a general concept
 National Democratic Movement (disambiguation)
 National Democratic Party (disambiguation)
 National Democrats (disambiguation)
 Nationalist Democracy Party, Turkey
 Party for National Democracy, Myanmar